The Cross and the Lynching Tree is a book about black liberation theology written by James H. Cone.

Background 
James H. Cone begins the book by providing a history of lynching in the United States and its impacts on black lives. Cone criticizes white clergy and academics for not making a connection between the crucifixion of Jesus and the black experience of lynching in the United States. Cone further criticizes the white church for actively participating in the lynching of black people throughout the 19th and 20th century. The second chapter of the book criticizes Reinhold Niebuhr for not speaking out against racism and lynching in the United States. The third chapter discusses Martin Luther King Jr. and his influence on Cone's work.

The book was published in 2011.

See also 

 Bibliography of Black theology

References

External links 
 

Books about race and ethnicity
Theology books
2011 non-fiction books